Eurypholis (meaning "broad scale") is a genus of prehistoric ray-finned fish.

References

 paleodb

Prehistoric aulopiformes
Prehistoric ray-finned fish genera
Cretaceous bony fish
Prehistoric fish of Africa